Maarten van der Graaff (born 14 October 1987) is a Dutch poet.

Career 

Van der Graaff made his debut with Vluchtautogedichten (2013). He won the C. Buddingh'-prijs in 2014 for this debut. He received the J.C. Bloem-poëzieprijs for his second poetry collection Dood Werk (2015).

In 2017, he made his debut as novelist with the novel Wormen en engelen. He won the Prijs voor het Religieuze Boek in 2018 for this book. The book was also nominated for the Anton Wachterprijs that year.

His works have been published by Atlas Contact.

Awards 
 2014: C. Buddingh'-prijs, Vluchtautogedichten
 2017: J.C. Bloem-poëzieprijs, Dood Werk
 2018: Prijs voor het Religieuze Boek, Wormen en engelen

Publications 
 2013: Vluchtautogedichten (poetry)
 2015: Dood Werk (poetry)
 2017: Wormen en engelen (novel)
 2020: Nederland in stukken (poetry)
 2022: Onder asfalt (novel)

References

External links 

 
 Maarten van der Graaff (in Dutch), Digital Library for Dutch Literature
 Maarten van der Graaff (in Dutch), Nederlandse Poëzie Encyclopedie (Dutch Poetry Encyclopedia)

1987 births
Living people
Dutch male poets
20th-century Dutch male writers
21st-century Dutch male writers
C. Buddingh' Prize winners
20th-century Dutch novelists
21st-century Dutch novelists